was a Japanese actor. He is famous for playing the role of Manhichioyabun on the television jidaigeki series Zenigata Heiji.

Selected filmography

Film

Soren dasshutsu: Onna gun'i to nise kyôjin (1958) - Sugiyama
Raiden (1959)
The End of Summer (1961) - Hayashi Seizo
Ôsaka yaro (1961)
Love Under the Crucifix (1962)
A Wanderer's Notebook (1962)
New Tale of Zatoichi (1963) - Inn keeper
Dokonjo ichidai (1963)
Chi to daiyamondo (1964)
Zatoichi's Flashing Sword (1964) - Boss Yasugoro of Takeya
Kenka inu (1964)
Kaoyaku (1965) - Kôda
Nezumi kozo Jirokichi (1965)
Matatabi san ning yakuza (1965)
Muhômatsu no isshô (1965) - Kumakichi
Bôryoku no minato: Tora to ôkami (1965)
Hondara kenpô (1965)
Zatôichi jigoku tabi (1965) - Yakuza boss of Ejimaya
Meiji kyokyakuden - sandaime shumei (1965)
Barâ kêtsu shobû (1965)
Yojōhan monogatari: Shōfu shino (1966) - Segawa Kikuzo
Nyohan hakai (1966) - Tôzô
Izuko e (1966)
Daimajin (1966) - Inugami Gunjuro
Waka oyabun norikomu (1966)
Yakuza gurentai (1966)
Tairiku nagaremono (1966)
Bakuto Shichi-nin (1966)
Nemuri Kyôshirô: Buraiken (1966) - Genshin Kusakabe
Kiba Ôkaminosuke (1968) - Nizaemon
Bôken daikatsugeki: Ôgon no touzoku (1966)
Yoidore hatoba (1966) - Tetsugogô
Zoku kyôdai jingi (1966)
Shin heitai yakuza (1966)
Santo hei oyabun shutsu jin (1966)
Santo hei oyabun (1966)
Ôtazune mono shichinin (1966)
Noren ichidai: jôkyô (1966)
Zatôichi tekka tabi (1967) - Iwagoro
Otoko no shôbu: Niô no irezumi (1967) - Matazô Kuramoto
Bakuchi-uchi: Ippiki ryû (1967)
Nemuri Kyôshirô burai-hikae: Mashô no hada (1967)
Zatôichi rôyaburi (1967) - Boss Tomizo
Shusse komori-uta (1967)
Kawachi yûkyôden (1967)
Zoku Toseinin (1967) - Masugorô Iwabuchi
Umî no G-Men: taiheiyô no yojinbô (1967)
Otoko namida non hâmonjô (1967)
Kyokotsu ichidai (1967)
Kyokakû no okitê (1967)
Hana fudâ tôsei (1967)
Ah kaiten tokubetsu kogetikai (1968)
Shinobi no manji (1968)
Bakuchi-uchi: Nagurikomi (1968) - Ishida
Hitori okami (1968)
Zenka mono (1968)
Bazoku yakuza (1968)
Kaettekita gokudô (1968)
Ikasama bakuchi (1968)
Hibotan bakuto: Isshuku ippan (1968) - Gisuke Kuramochi
Tomuraishi tachi (1968) - Yonekura
Otoko no shobu: byakko no tetsu (1968)
Gokuchu no kaoyaku (1968)
Gokuaku bôzu (1968)
Bakuto Ichidai Chimatsuri Fudo (1969) - Gozo
Hibotan bakuto: Nidaime shûmei (1969)
Hissatsu bakuchi-uchi (1969)
Yoru no kayô series: Onna (1969)
Tosei-nin Retsuden (1969)
Nihon jokyo-den: kyokaku geisha (1969)
Gorotsuki butai (1969)
Gokuaku bôzu: nenbutsu hitokiri tabi (1969)
Chôeki san kyôdai (1969)
Bakuto ikka (1970)
Gokuaku bozu nenbutsu sandangiri (1970)
Onna toseinin (1971)
Kantô Tekiya ikka: Goromen himatsuri (1971)
Bakuchi-uchi: Inochi-huda (1971)
Suibare ikka: otoko ni naritai (1971)
Poruno no teiô (1971)
Gendai poruno-den: Sentensei inpu (1971) - Ken'ichirô Matsumura
Onna toseinin: ota no mushimasu (1971)
Nihon jokyo-den: ketto midare-bana (1971)
Nihon aku nin den (1971)
Kizu darake no jinsei (1971)
Akû oyabûn tai daigashî (1971)
Junko intai kinen eiga: Kantô hizakura ikka (1972)
Kînagashî hyâkunîn (1972)
Shôkin kubi: Isshun hachi-nin giri (1972)
Lone Wolf and Cub: Baby Cart in Peril (1972) - Yagyū Retsudo
Zorome no san kyôdai (1972)
Showa onna bakuto (1972)
Otoko no daimon (1972)
Sukeban (1972)
Battles Without Honor and Humanity (1973)
Sex & Fury (1973) - Inamura
Mamushi no kyôdai: Musho gurashi yonen-han (1973)
Shin Zatôichi monogatari: Kasama no chimatsuri (1973) - Boss Iwagoro
Battles Without Honor and Humanity: Deadly Fight in Hiroshima (1973) - Tokimori Kanichi
Yasagure anego den: Sôkatsu rinchi (1973) - Gôda
Kyofu joshikôkô: Furyo monzetsu guruupu (1973) - Hiroshi Nikaidô
Battles Without Honor and Humanity: Proxy War (1973) - Aihara Shigeo
Yamaguchi-gumi San-daime (1973)
Sân ike kangôku: kyo akû han (1973)
Bohachi Bushido: Code of the Forgotten Eight (1973) - Shirobei Daimon
Battles Without Honor and Humanity: Police Tactics (1974) - Aihara Shigeo
The Street Fighter (1974) - Bayan
The Street Fighter's Last Revenge (1974) - Watanabe Rikizo
Datsugoku Hiroshima satsujinshû (1974)
Â kessen kôkûtai (1974)
Cops vs. Thugs (1975) - Ohara Takeo
Nihon bôryôku rettô: Keihanshin koroshi no gundan (1975)
Bakamasa horamasa toppamasa (1976)
Yamaguchi-gumi gaiden: Kyushu shinko-sakusen (1977)
Hokuriku dairi sensô (1977)
Doberman cop (1977) - Fujikawa
Rashamen (1977) - Denbei Tanimura
Nihon no Don: Kanketsuhen (1978) - Ryukichi Yoshino
The Fall of Ako Castle (1978) - Yoshida Chuzaemon
Hono-o no gotoku (1981)
Roaring Fire (1982) - Yo Gentoku
Yaju-deka (1982) - Kido
Legend of the Eight Samurai (1983) - Mayuroku
Hissatsu! III Ura ka Omote ka (1986) - Rusui
Yogisha (1987) - Yunosuke
Gokudo no onna-tachi 2 (1987) - Hayanose
Kunoichi ninpô-chô III: Higi densetsu no kai (1993)
Kunoichi ninpô-chô IV: Chûshingura hishô (1994)
Shuranosuke Zanma-Ken: Yôma Densetsu (1996) - Taizen Imura
Karaoke (1999)
Audition (1999) - Doctor

Television
Zenigata Heiji (1966-1984) - Miwa no Manhichioyabun
Kyoto Satsujinannai (1980-2010) - Chief Akiyama
Mito Kōmon (season 35) (2005) - Yamino Hotei

References

1928 births
Male actors from Kyoto
Japanese male film actors
Japanese male television actors
20th-century Japanese male actors
Japanese male stage actors
2012 deaths